Bitter is a young adult novel written by Nigerian writer Akwaeke Emezi and published by Knopf on February 15, 2022. A prequel to Emezi's Pet, Bitter tells the story of a Black teenage girl living in a city troubled by constant protests and violence.

Background 
When Emezi first began writing Pet in 2017, they had planned for it to be part of a trilogy but eventually gave up on the idea. For Bitter, Emezi "wanted to write about revolution but community" and how people who might want to help don't necessarily need to be in the forefront.

Reception 
Kirkus Reviews gave the book a starred review, in which they highlight the "timely tension" present in Emezi's writing as the characters must decide "when and how to act in the face of unjustifiable state violence, among other societal atrocities." In addition, the reviewer noted how the various queer characters "receive love and support" from those around them. Publishers Weekly praised the characters, especially due to having "the agency to define the future for themselves and their city." They also called the main character, Bitter, "all the more memorable for her complexity."

Natalie Berglind, who reviewed for The Bulletin of the Center for Children's Books, called the novel timely due to "its mostly Black cast and escalating protests against an unjust world." Berglind also noted how it attempts to tackle the subject of using violence as "the means of disrupting long held power dynamics" and how the author does not provide an answer to related questions but instead hopes to provoke "thoughtful discussion." They conclude by saying "the ending is abrupt" but "offers tempered optimism to the teen who [...] feels immense frustration with a world unconcerned about their future."

References 

2020s LGBT novels
2022 Nigerian novels
2022 children's books
Alfred A. Knopf books
LGBT-related young adult novels
Nigerian English-language novels
Nigerian LGBT novels
Novels by Akwaeke Emezi
Novels with transgender themes